Pfahl is a German language metonymic occupational surname for someone who made posts and stakes or erected them. Notable people with the name include:

 Armin Pfahl-Traughber (1963), German political scientist, sociologist and government official
 John Pfahl (1947–2021), American photographer
 Wolfgang Pfahl (1947–2021)), German politician

References 

German-language surnames
Occupational surnames
Surnames from nicknames